Ernest Ferdinand Grecian, best known as Barney Grecian (18 November 1871 – 2 June 1919), was an Australian rules football player.

Early life
Grecian was born in Geelong, Victoria in 1872.

Playing career
Grecian joined  in the Victorian Football Association (VFA) at the end of 1892, and made his debut in 1893. He played two VFA premierships with Essendon before moving to Western Australia in 1896, and joining  in the West Australian Football Association (WAFA - now WAFL), where he captained premiership-winning teams in 1897 and 1899. Between 1896 and 1900, he played 65 matches for West Perth.

His state league career ended when he transferred in 1900 to Coolgardie to work in the post office.

Death
In 1919 Grecian was hospitalised with athlete's heart. He died on 2 June 1919 and was buried at Karrakatta Cemetery.

Honours
In 2004 Grecian was inducted in the West Australian Football Hall of Fame.

References

1871 births
1919 deaths
West Australian Football Hall of Fame inductees
West Perth Football Club players
Australian rules footballers from Geelong
Essendon Football Club (VFA) players
Burials at Karrakatta Cemetery